Ferdinand Schmitz (October 14, 1919 – November 6, 1981) was a German wrestler who competed at the 1952 Summer Olympics. In Helsinki he participated in both the freestyle and Greco-Roman bantamweight competitions, eventually withdrawing from the former and finishing sixth in the latter. He had two podium results at the European Championships, placing third in 56 kg Greco-Roman event in 1938 and second in the 61-kg Greco-Roman event in 1939. He was born in Cologne and was a member of ESV Olympia Köln. His brother Heini Nettesheim was also an Olympic wrestler who competed in 1936, as well as 1952.

References

1919 births
1981 deaths
Wrestlers at the 1952 Summer Olympics
German male sport wrestlers
Olympic wrestlers of Germany
Sportspeople from Cologne
20th-century German people